The Jameh Mosque of Khorramshahr (also called Khorramshahr Central Mosque) (Masjid-e-Jāmeh Khorramshahr) is the grand, congregational mosque (Jāmeh) of Khorramshahr city, within Khorramshahr County, Khuzestan Province, Iran. The mosque is one of the historical places of Khorramshahr city. This building is a place where people of the city come there to worship together.

During Iran-Iraq War, the mosque partially dilapidated. During the war, it was the center of command and logistics for the city's defenders.

Jameh Mosque of Khorramshahr is the thirty thousandth historical monument of Iran, which was registered in the list of national monuments in 2011.

History and specifications
Jameh Mosque of Khorramshahr has more than 120 years old, but its founder is unknown. Its area was 1209 square meters which 40 percent of it was destroyed in Iran-Iraq War. The Khorramshahr Mosque was rebuilt after the war, 4000 square meters added to mosque from the north side for facilities such as a guesthouse for pilgrims and a pedestrian passageway, as well as a commercial site.

In 1969, a piece of land from the west side was added to the mosque and renovated as it is now.

It has two finial and two small and large domes, over 120 years old, and 770 square meters of mosaic tile is a special feature of this monument. This old mosque has a brick facade.

The Mosque has about 1,000 square meters of adobe tiles which the verses of the Quran are written on those. It has two finial with a height of 28 meters from the ground floor and two large and small domes. An air conditioning and central cooling system have been created.

See also
 Khorramshahr
 List of Mosques in Iran
 History of Persian domes
 Iran–Iraq War
 Liberation of Khorramshahr
 Battle of Khorramshahr

References

External links
 Satellite view of Khorramshahr Mosque
 Khorramshahr Mosque on map

National works of Iran
Mosques in Iran
Buildings and structures in Khuzestan Province